Cylindrovertilla is a genus of minute, air-breathing land snails, terrestrial pulmonate gastropod molluscs or micromolluscs in the family Vertiginidae, the whorl snails.

Species
Species within the  genus Cylindrovertilla include:
 Cylindrovertilla kingi (Cox, 1864)

References

External links 
 Australian Biological Resources Study info

Vertiginidae
Taxonomy articles created by Polbot